Hönökaka (English: Hönö bread or Hönö cake) is a type of Swedish flat soft white pricked bread. It is named after the island town Hönö in Gothenburg's northern archipelago, and was originally baked by the people living on said archipelago's different islands. The bread is baked in round flat pieces, but is normally sold as half-circles. In 2014, industrially made hönökaka was produced by two manufactures, Åkes Äkta Hönökakor and Pågen.

Åke "Grytens-Karl" Johannesson began his bakery business on Hönö in 1934, and moved his operations to Torslanda in 1960.

The bread was baked on Hönö by the area's fishing and farming families. The flat bread was easy to both store and eat during fishing trips on the sea. Just as with crispbread, the hönökaka was holed so that they could be hung from the rafters on poles. The bread was stored for a long time and was often eaten even after it gone stale and hard. Homemade hönökaka is usually slightly firmer than industrially baked.

References 

Swedish breads